Hulda Marie Bentzen (1858–1930) was an early professional female Norwegian photographer who established studios in Bergen and Voss.

Life

Born on 18 December 1858 in Bergen, Bentzen was the daughter of the sea captain Einar Bentzen (1824–1876) and Karen Bertine Gullaksen. After learning photography under Max Behrends (1839–1903), she opened a business in Bergen in 1886. The firm appears to have been taken over by Justus Lockwood in the early 1900s when she opened a business in Voss. In 1918, she put the business up for sale but continued to reproduce old works until much later. She also created postcards. Bentzen received a medal at the Bergen Exhibition in 1898.

Solberg was one of several women who established early photographic studios in Norway. The Encyclopedia of nineteenth-century photography are disparaging about many of these but they pick out several of note including Marie Høeg in Horten, Louise Abel in Christiania, Louise Wold in Holmestrand, Augusta Solberg in Lillehammer and Bentzen and Agnes Nyblin in Bergen.

References

External links

 Examples of Bentzen's work in Bergen's Marcus collection

19th-century Norwegian photographers
1858 births
1930 deaths
Norwegian women photographers
Photographers from Bergen
19th-century Norwegian women artists
19th-century women photographers
20th-century women photographers
20th-century Norwegian women artists